Robert Pierrepont, 3rd Earl of Kingston-upon-Hull (c. 1660 – June 1682) was an English peer.

The eldest son of Robert Pierrepont of Thoresby, Nottinghamshire, and his wife Elizabeth Evelyn, and the grandson of William Pierrepont of Thoresby, in 1680, he succeeded his great-uncle, Henry Pierrepont, 1st Marquess of Dorchester, as Earl of Kingston-upon-Hull. He died unmarried at Dieppe in 1682 and was succeeded in the earldom by his brother William Pierrepont, 4th Earl of Kingston-upon-Hull.

External links

References

1660 births
1682 deaths
Robert
Earls of Kingston-upon-Hull